The term “SLATT” is used in by rappers all over the world and it means Slime Love All The Time. It started being used by the rapper known as “Thug Slim”

See also
 Slat (disambiguation)
 Slot (disambiguation)